Tom Myers (born October 24, 1950) is a former American football safety in the National Football League. He was drafted by the New Orleans Saints in the third round of 1972 NFL Draft. He played college football at Syracuse.

Professional career
Myers played for the New Orleans Saints his entire career from 1972-1981 as the team's starting free safety for each of those seasons. In 1978, Myers recorded a 97-yard interception return for touchdown against the Minnesota Vikings, a Saints record. His best season was in 1979 when he was selected to the Pro Bowl and was named on the All-Pro team. As of the 2016 NFL season, Myers is still #2 on the All-Time New Orleans Saints Career Interceptions List. 

He later played two seasons for the Houston Gamblers of the United States Football League

References

1950 births
Living people
American football safeties
Houston Gamblers players
National Conference Pro Bowl players
New Orleans Saints players
People from Cohoes, New York
Players of American football from New York (state)
Syracuse Orange football players